The second HMS Tarpon (N17) was a T-class submarine of the Royal Navy. She was laid down by Scotts, Greenock and launched in October 1939. She is named after the large fish Tarpon; one species of which is native to the Atlantic, and the other to the Indo-Pacific Oceans.

Career
Tarpon had a short career, serving in the North Sea. She left Portsmouth on 5 April 1940 for Rosyth in company with HMS Severn. The following day they were ordered to Norway. On the 10th Tarpon was ordered to take up a new position. Tarpon was never heard from again.

It is asserted that there is a combination of British and German records which state that she was engaged by Schiff 40. The records show that Tarpon had attacked the Q-ship Schiff 40/Schürbek, but her first torpedoes had missed. The Q-ship picked up the Tarpon on her sonar and her periscope was sighted. The ship dropped numerous depth charges in a sustained counterattack that went on most of the morning.  Finally a pattern of depth charges brought wreckage to the surface. The Q-ship remained on the scene until 0500 the next morning when it became clear the submarine had been sunk.  Tarpon was reported overdue on 22 April 1940.

Wreck
The wreck was found and identified in the Danish part of the North Sea, near the harbour town of Thyborøn, by a Danish commercial diver,  Gert Normann Andersen of the company JD-Contractor and British marine archaeologist Dr Innes McCartney in March 2016. The wreck was explored in a live TV program by Denmark's Radio on 28 August 2016. The submarine wreck was found with two torpedo tubes empty; confirming it likely they were fired in battle before her sinking. It is therefore still most likely she was then sunk by depth charges. The wreck is submerged in 40 metres of water.

Notes

References
 
  
 
 
 
 

 

British T-class submarines of the Royal Navy
Ships built on the River Clyde
1939 ships
World War II submarines of the United Kingdom
World War II shipwrecks in the North Sea
Maritime incidents in April 1940
Submarines sunk by German warships